Aso River is a river of northern Democratic Republic of Congo. It flows through Bondo Territory in Bas-Uele District.

References

Rivers of the Democratic Republic of the Congo